WTWV (channel 23) is a religious independent television station in Memphis, Tennessee, United States. It is owned by Tri-State Christian Television alongside Senatobia, Mississippi–licensed TCT owned-and-operated station WWTW (channel 34). WTWV and WWTW share studios on Kirby Whitten Road in the northeast section of Memphis; through a channel sharing agreement, the two stations transmit using WTWV's spectrum from a tower in Ellendale, Tennessee.

History
The station was originally scheduled to launch on May 22, 2008, but WTWV's debut was delayed due to technical difficulties. WTWV officially signed on the air on May 28, 2008, broadcasting on UHF channel 14, but has later relocated to channel 23.

On May 28, 2020, Flinn Broadcasting Corporation announced that it would sell WTWV and WWTW, along with sister stations KCWV in Duluth, Minnesota, WWJX in Jackson, Mississippi, WBIH in Selma, Alabama, and WFBD in Destin, Florida, to Tri-State Christian Television for an undisclosed price pending Federal Communications Commission (FCC) approval. The stations would become owned-and-operated stations of the TCT network and the second and third full-power religious stations in the Memphis area.

Technical information

Subchannels
The station's digital channel is multiplexed:

References

TWV
Television channels and stations established in 2008
2008 establishments in Tennessee
Religious television stations in the United States